Epioblasma othcaloogensis, the southern acornshell or southern acorn riffle shell, was a species of freshwater mussel in the family Unionidae. It was only known from the Coosa and Cahaba Rivers of the southeastern United States.

This species has been heavily impacted by dam construction, dredging, and water pollution. The last living individual was seen in 1974, and subsequent surveys have failed to locate any living populations. Some scientists believe it is now extinct.

It appears to be closely related to the critically endangered Epioblasma penita.

References

Endemic fauna of the United States
Critically endangered fauna of the United States
othcaloogensis
Bivalves described in 1857
ESA endangered species
Taxonomy articles created by Polbot